Opryland  may refer to:

 Opryland USA – defunct theme park (in operation from 1972 to 1997) located in Nashville, Tennessee
 Gaylord Opryland Resort & Convention Center – formerly known as "Opryland Hotel", located in Nashville, Tennessee